The 1907 Perth by-election was held on 12 February 1907. The by-election was held due to the resignation of the incumbent Liberal MP, Robert Wallace, in order to become Chairman of the County of London sessions. It was won by the Liberal candidate Sir Robert Pullar, who was unopposed. Pullar was then aged 79 years (less six days), making his possibly the oldest debut of a British MP in the 20th century.

References

1907 elections in the United Kingdom
1907 in Scotland
1900s elections in Scotland
Politics of Perth and Kinross
Politics of Perth, Scotland
By-elections to the Parliament of the United Kingdom in Scottish constituencies
Unopposed by-elections to the Parliament of the United Kingdom (need citation)